On November 23, 2012, Jordan Davis, a black 17-year-old high school student, was murdered at a Gate Petroleum gas station in Jacksonville, Florida, by Michael David Dunn, a white 45-year-old software developer, following an argument over loud music played by Davis and his three friends, in what was believed to be a racially motivated shooting.

Dunn was convicted on three counts of attempted second-degree murder for firing at three other teenagers who were with Davis and one count of firing into an occupied vehicle. The jury could not reach a verdict about whether to convict Dunn for the murder of Davis at the first trial. In a second trial, Dunn was found guilty of the first-degree murder of Davis and sentenced to life imprisonment without the possibility of parole plus 105 years in prison, which is two de facto consecutive life sentences.

In 2021, the jury and judges on the Florida Supreme Court rejected Dunn's appeal based on the stand-your-ground law in Florida.

Background 
Dunn and his fiancée Rhonda Rouer traveled from their home in Brevard County to attend Dunn's son's wedding in Orange Park, near Jacksonville, Florida. Dunn and Rouer left the wedding early in order to return to their hotel and take care of their six-month-old puppy. On the way back to their hotel, the two decided to stop at the Gate Petroleum gas station to purchase a bottle of wine.

Tommie Stornes, Leland Brunson, Jordan Davis, and Tevin Thompson had been spending the day traveling to various malls when they decided to go to the Gate Petroleum gas station in order to buy gum and cigarettes.

Murder
The shooting of Jordan Davis took place in Jacksonville in Duval County. Around 7:30 p.m., four teenage boys (Leland Brunson, Jordan Davis, Tommie Stornes, and Tevin Thompson) stopped at a Gate Petroleum gas station. Stornes left his red Dodge Durango SUV running while he went into the store. Brunson, Davis, and Thompson remained in the vehicle listening to music which was described as "very loud." Dunn, driving a black Volkswagen Jetta sedan, and his fiancée Rhonda Rouer pulled into the right adjacent parking spot. Rouer left their car to purchase white wine and chips. She testified that Dunn told her "I hate that thug music," before she left the car for the store, though Dunn claims he used the phrase "rap crap."

The bass from the loud music playing in the teens' SUV annoyed Dunn, who asked for it to be turned down. The front seat passenger, Tevin Thompson, initially complied and turned the volume down, but Jordan Davis requested the volume be turned back up.

Davis' protests continued and an independent witness overheard Dunn say "No, you're not gonna talk to me that way." Dunn, who had a concealed weapons permit, took a handgun out of his glove compartment and started firing at Davis' door, hitting him in the legs, lungs, and aorta. As the SUV backed up to evade his gunshots, Dunn opened his own door and continued firing at the car in shooter's stance, as the boys ducked for cover. Dunn later testified that he still feared for his safety as well as that of Rouer who was to return to the vehicle imminently.

After the shooting, Stornes drove the SUV away to a nearby parking lot and stopped to find Davis "gasping for air". 

Rouer returned to Dunn's car. They returned to their hotel where they ordered pizza. Dunn did not contact the police. The next morning Rouer saw a report about the shooting on the news indicating that Jordan Davis had died. Dunn testified that on the drive home he called a neighbor who works in law enforcement to arrange to speak to him about the shooting, but phone records indicate that the neighbor actually called him, and Rouer testified that the shooting was never mentioned during the call. Dunn returned to his home in Satellite Beach the following day at 10:30 a.m., where he was arrested after an eyewitness reported his license plate to police.

After his arrest, Dunn claimed that Davis threatened him with a "gun or a stick". Dunn's fiancée, who served as an adversarial witness, said no such item was mentioned to her at any point. Investigators later searched the teenagers' SUV and found no weapons. Forensic scientists determined that in the short distance the boys traveled, a weapon could not have been stashed in a place that would not have been immediately visible to crime scene investigators. Contrary to Dunn's claim that he mentioned a weapon to Rouer, she testified that he never mentioned a gun either that night or the next day.

Legal proceedings
Shortly after Davis's death, his parents, Ron Davis and Lucy McBath, and some of the other vehicle occupants, filed civil complaints against Dunn. They were represented by John Michael Phillips in wrongful death and defamation lawsuits against Dunn. The cases were settled for an undisclosed amount in January 2014. Dunn's insurance company, Progressive Select Insurance, challenged its duty to cover the lawsuit, but dismissed its lawsuit in conjunction with the settlement. In his criminal trial, Dunn had been declared "broke."

In closing arguments at the first trial, the defense lawyer for Dunn cited the language of Florida's stand-your-ground law. 

On February 15, 2014, after more than 30 hours of deliberation, the jury found Dunn guilty on the three counts of attempted murder. The jury could not reach an agreement on the charge of first-degree murder, and the judge declared a mistrial on that count. Former Florida state attorney Angela Corey stated that her office would seek a retrial for this charge. Dunn's attorney subsequently requested that sentencing on the four counts of which Dunn already had been convicted be delayed until after Dunn's retrial. Dunn faced a minimum of 75 years in prison on the following counts: a minimum mandatory sentence of 20 years for each count of attempted second-degree murder, and up to 15 years for firing into a moving vehicle.

Jury selection in Dunn's retrial began on September 22, 2014, and opening statements took place on September 25. Dunn was found guilty on October 1, 2014, at the conclusion of the retrial. Dunn was given a sentence of life in prison without parole plus 90 years, ensuring he will never be released from prison for the remainder of his life.

Following the trial, Dunn's attorney filed for appeal with the First District Court of Appeal for the State of Florida. On November 17, 2016, his appeal was denied.

On June 22, 2020, the Florida Supreme Court rejected Dunn's appeal and refused to take the case. Dunn stated that he received "ineffective assistance of counsel". The justices did not explain their reasons behind the refusal.

Aftermath

Reactions 
Dunn's former neighbor, Charles Hendrix, said he was not surprised by his behavior. Hendrix described Dunn as arrogant and controlling, adding that Dunn's ex-wives told him that Dunn was violent and abusive toward them, although he never personally witnessed this. Hendrix spoke of a previous discussion where Dunn asked him if he knew anyone who would "take care of" someone who infuriated him in an unrelated incident, and Hendrix interpreted further discussion as Dunn wanting to send a hit on this person.

Davis' father Ron Davis said, "I'm in constant contact with Tracy Martin, Trayvon's father, and I text Sybrina [Trayvon's mother] all the time and I just want to let them know, every time I get justice for Jordan, it's going to be justice for Trayvon, for us." He said he wanted to confront Dunn in jail about his son's murder.

Rebecca Dunn, Dunn's daughter, defended her father's story, by her statement during an interview, "He is going to protect himself if he sees no other way than to bring out his gun, then that's what he's going to do." She described Dunn as "a good man. He's not a racist. He's very loving."

Davis' mother, Lucy McBath, ran for Congress in Georgia's 6th congressional district in 2018, running on a platform that included reform of gun laws. McBath cited the activism of students after the Stoneman Douglas High School shooting as a reason for her run. She defeated incumbent Karen Handel, winning 160,139 votes (50.5%) to Handel's 156,875 (49.5%). In 2020, she defeated Handel in a rematch to win reelection to a second term.

Davis' murder is one of many referenced by social justice activists (including many black parents) as a reminder that unarmed children who died at the hands of police or white men, mattered as individual human beings. ABC News, Australia says the case has become part of the national conversation about the dangers facing young black men in America today. The murder is believed to have inspired activism of the Black Lives Matter movement. During the 2016 Democratic National Convention, Davis' mother, Lucy McBath, talked about supporting the Black Lives Matter movement and said, "His death doesn't overshadow his life."

The murder was one of the primary inspirations for the award-winning young adult novel Dear Martin, by Nic Stone.

Documentaries 
In January 2015, the documentary 3 ½ Minutes, 10 Bullets (originally titled 3 ½ Minutes) premiered at the Sundance Film Festival. The documentary, directed by Marc Silver, explores the shooting, the trial, and Florida's Stand Your Ground laws. The documentary won the U.S. Documentary Special Jury Award for Social Impact at the 2015 Sundance Film Festival. The film distribution was sold to HBO.

Davis's story also features in the 2015 documentary film The Armor of Light, the directorial debut of Disney heir Abigail Disney. The film follows Rob Schenck, a pro-life Evangelical minister; Lucy McBath, the mother of teenager Jordan Davis; and attorney John Michael Phillips as they interact in the years after the shooting. The film debates the question: "Is it possible to be both pro-gun and pro-life?" The Armor of Light premiered at the Tribeca Film Festival in April 2015 before opening theatrically on October 30, 2015.

See also
 Crime in Florida
 Mothers of the Movement

Notes

References

External links
 Arrest and Booking Report of Incident,  michaeldunntrial.com; archived from the original February 15, 2014.
 The Jordan Davis Foundation

2012 in Florida
2012 controversies in the United States
2012 murders in the United States
21st century in Jacksonville, Florida
African-American history of Florida
2010s crimes in Florida
Deaths by firearm in Florida
Deaths by person in Florida
Murder in Florida
Noise pollution
Race and law in the United States
21st-century American trials
Murdered African-American people
People murdered in Florida
Black Lives Matter
November 2012 crimes in the United States
Controversies in Florida
History of racism in Florida
Incidents of violence against boys
Race-related controversies in the United States